The Aphanizomenonaceae are a family of cyanobacteria containing mostly genera which produce aerotopes. Cyanobacteria from the family Aphanizomenonaceae may form blooms in lentic freshwater bodies which may be dangerous for humans.

References

Nostocales
Cyanobacteria families